Pertsch is a surname. Notable people with the surname include:

Jennifer Pertsch, Canadian media writer
Matteo Pertsch (1769–1834), Austrian architect